Petasina is a genus of air-breathing land snails, terrestrial animal pulmonate gastropod mollusks in the family Hygromiidae (the hairy snails and their allies).

Species 
This genus contains the following species:
 Petasina bakowskii (Polinski, 1924)
 Petasina bielzi (Bielz, 1860)
 Petasina edentula (Draparnaud, 1805)
 Petasina filicina (Pfeiffer, 1841)
 Petasina leucozona (Pfeiffer, 1828)
 Petasina lurida (Pfeiffer, 1828)
 Petasina subtecta (Polinski, 1929)
 Petasina unidentata (Draparnaud, 1805) - type species

References 

 
Hygromiidae
Taxonomy articles created by Polbot